Gilda Montenegro Conejo (born January 27, 1967) is a Costa Rican slalom canoeist who competed in the 1990s. Competing in two Summer Olympics, her best finish was 26th in the K-1 event in Barcelona in 1992.

Montenegro's husband, Oliver Fix of Germany, won the gold medal in the men's K-1 slalom event at the 1996 Summer Olympics in Atlanta.

References

Wallechinsky, David and Jaime Loucky (2008). "Canoeing: Women's Kayak Slalom Singles". In The Complete Book of the Olympics: 2008 Edition. London: Aurum Press Limited. pp. 495–6.

1967 births
Canoeists at the 1992 Summer Olympics
Canoeists at the 1996 Summer Olympics
Costa Rican female canoeists
Living people
Olympic canoeists of Costa Rica